Interop is an annual information technology conference organised by Informa PLC. It takes place in the US and Tokyo (Japan) each year. 2016 marked Interop's (US) 30th anniversary and throughout that time, Interop has promoted interoperability and openness, beginning with IP networks and continuing in today's emerging cloud computing era.

History 
The Las Vegas International Telecoms Show is called "the granddaddy of networking shows" because it was created in the late 1980s, a decade before the technology and internet bubble that made it a success. It reached a peak with 61,000 visitors at the 2001 edition, just before the bursting of this bubble, which resulted in a major stock market crash for this sector. This year's event was marked by innovation, and among the major telecom providers, the rivalry between Juniper Networks and Cisco Systems in the Terabit router market, while the so-called "alternative" operators, such as KPNQwest, Global Crossing and Carrier, launched revolutionary offerings in the enterprise market.

After the crash of 2002, the fever has subsided. The 2004 edition in Las Vegas brought together less than 300 exhibitors. The following editions saw a recovery. The organizer of the 2013 edition hopes to increase the number of visitors from 18,000 in 2012 to 20,000 with the presence of 500 suppliers.

2020 dates 
 Interop Tokyo - April 13 - 15

2019 dates 
 Interop Las Vegas - May 20 - 23

 Interop Tokyo - June 12 - 14

2018 dates 
 Interop ITX Las Vegas - April 30 - May 4
 Interop Tokyo - June 13 - 15

2017 dates
 Interop ITX Las Vegas - May 15 - 19
 Interop Tokyo - June 8 - 10

2016 dates
 Interop Las Vegas - May 2 - 6
 Interop Tokyo - June 8 - 10
 Interop London - June 21 - 22

2015 dates
 Interop Las Vegas - April 27 - May 1
 Interop Tokyo - June 10 – 12
 Interop London - June 16 - 18
 Interop Delhi - Summer 2015
 Interop Mumbai - Summer 2015

2014 dates
 Interop Las Vegas - March 31 - April 4
 Demonstrated Shortest Path Bridging and Software-defined networking
 Interop Tokyo - June 9 – 13
 Interop New York - September 29 - October 3

2013 dates
 Interop Las Vegas - May 6 - 10
 InteropNet demonstrated IEEE 802.1aq (Shortest Path Bridging - SPB) interoperability between  Alcatel-Lucent, Avaya, HP, and Spirent.
 Interop Tokyo - June 12 – 14
 Interop Mumbai - November 20 – 22

2012 dates
 Interop Las Vegas - May 6 – 10
 Interop Tokyo - June 12 – 15
 Interop New York - October 1 – 5
 Interop Mumbai - October 10 – 12

2011 events
Interop Las Vegas was held in May 2011 at the Mandalay Bay Convention Center. Exhibitors included Avaya, Hewlett-Packard, Citrix Systems, D-Link, Exinda, Riverbed Technology and F5 Networks. Notable speakers include Vint Cerf and Mark B. Templeton.

The Tokyo Conference was held in June, 2011. The Mumbai conference was held in September, and the New York conference in October at the Jacob K. Javits Convention Center.

References 

Computer conferences
Las Vegas Valley conventions and trade shows
Informa brands